Arif Mehmood (born June 21, 1983) is a retired Pakistani professional footballer who played for WAPDA F.C. as a striker from 2004 to 2016, after gaining promotion from their youth team where he spent six years from 1998 to 2004.

He has been the top-scorer in the Pakistan Premier League five times, leading the charts in 2004–05, 2006–07, 2007–08, 2009–10 and 2010–11.  In his first trial with WAPDA he manages to impress several other teams; however, WAPDA offered substantially more than other clubs.

Early life
Mehmood was born on 21 June 1983 to Haji Mohammad in Multan, Punjab, Pakistan. He completed his studies from Government Comprehensive Boys High School and graduated in engineering from Government Technology College.

Early career
Mehmood started his career with the amateur team Young Gulshan Multan, from where WAPDA scouted him and selected him in their youth team in 1998.

WAPDA first team

2004–09: Debut and early career
Mehmood got called up for the senior team in 2004-05 Pakistan Premier League season, where he scored 20 goals in 30 appearances, earning him the top-scorer award. WAPDA won their first Premier League title and fifth league title. Mehmood was a major influence in winning the title for WAPDA. WAPDA qualified for 2005 AFC President's Cup after winning the league. They were placed in Group B, with Blue Star SC, FC Dordoi Bishkek and Phnom Penh Crown FC. Mehmood scored two goals in three appearances, which includes the goal against Dordoi Bishkek, WAPDA won the game 1–0.

In 2005-06 Pakistan Premier League season WAPDA finished Army, and repeating the same feat in 2006-07 Pakistan Premier League, although this time Mehmood finished as top scorer after scoring 19 goals in 20 appearances.

Mehmood won the league for second time in 2007-08 Pakistan Premier League after beating Army in the last day of the season and winning the league by 1 point. Mehmood was again the top scorer, scoring 21 goals in 26 games. WAPDA qualified for 2008 AFC President's Cup where they finished bottom of the group.

Mehmood added another silverware after winning the league again in 2008-09 Pakistan Premier League season. In this process they qualified for 2009 AFC President's Cup. Mehmood scored a brace against Taiwan Power Company, WAPDA won the game 1–3, finishing second in the group. WAPDA once again faced their group Regar-TadAZ in the semi-finals, WAPDA lost the game 4–3 in extra time with Mehmood scoring the second goal for WAPDA and third goal of the match in the 84th minute.

Career statistics

Club

Goals for Senior National Team

His first international match was against Kyrgyzstan in 2006 FIFA World Cup qualification, which Pakistan lost 0–2 in Karachi, and the return leg saw Pakistan getting knocked out after losing 4–0 in Bishkek (6–0 on aggregate).

Honours

Club 
WAPDA
 Pakistan Premier League (4): 2004–05, 2007–08, 2008–09, 2010–11

Individual 
 Pakistan Premier League golden boot (5): 2004–05, 2006–07, 2007–08, 2009–10, 2010–11

References

External links
 

Living people
Pakistani footballers
Pakistan international footballers
1983 births
Footballers from Multan
WAPDA F.C. players
Footballers at the 2002 Asian Games
Association football forwards
Asian Games competitors for Pakistan
South Asian Games gold medalists for Pakistan
South Asian Games medalists in football